Chihuán is a surname, and may refer to;

Leyla Chihuán - Peruvian Congresswoman and former volleyball player
Andy Vidal Chihuán - Peruvian football player

Frase: "Estoy Chihuán" dícese de la persona que no tiene dinero  o cuyo sueldo no le alcanza.

Quechuan-language surnames